"Baby, I Love Your Way/Freebird Medley (Free Baby)" is a song by American dance-pop band Will to Power. The song combines elements of two previously recorded rock songs: "Baby, I Love Your Way", a number-12 Billboard Hot 100 hit from 1976 by British-born singer Peter Frampton, and "Free Bird" by American Southern rock band Lynyrd Skynyrd, which reached number 19 on the Hot 100 chart in 1975. Suzi Carr is the female vocalist and a producer for the song.

In the United States, the medley spent one week at number one on the Billboard Hot 100 and also peaked at number two on the Billboard Adult Contemporary chart. Internationally, the song topped the Canadian, Norwegian, and Portuguese charts and reached the top 20 in Australia, Ireland, New Zealand, the United Kingdom, and West Germany. In March and April 2009, VH1 ran a countdown of the 100 Greatest One Hit Wonders of the 80s, placing it at number 97 on the countdown despite the group having another US top-10 hit in 1991 with a cover version of the 1975 10cc hit "I'm Not in Love."

Track listings

Charts

Weekly charts

Year-end charts

Certifications

See also
 List of Billboard Hot 100 number-one singles of 1988

References

1988 singles
1988 songs
Billboard Hot 100 number-one singles
Cashbox number-one singles
Epic Records singles
Music medleys
Number-one singles in Norway
RPM Top Singles number-one singles
Songs written by Allen Collins
Songs written by Peter Frampton
Songs written by Ronnie Van Zant
Will to Power (band) songs